A Bit of Liverpool, released as With Love (From Us to You) in the UK, is the third studio album by the Supremes, released in the fall of 1964 on the Motown label. It was produced by Berry Gordy with Hal Davis and Marc Gordon doing the mixing.

The Supremes performed the Beatles' "Eight Days a Week" on several television shows including Shindig and Hullabaloo, though the song did not make the album. The album just missed the Top 20 in the U.S., peaking at No. 21. While not quite as prolific as the Beatles, the Supremes enjoyed three albums charting simultaneously in 1964–65.

Track listing

Side One
"How Do You Do It?" (Mitch Murray)
"A World Without Love" (John Lennon, Paul McCartney)
"The House of the Rising Sun" (Traditional)
"A Hard Day's Night" (Lennon, McCartney)
"Because" (Dave Clark)
"You've Really Got a Hold on Me" (Smokey Robinson)

Side Two
"You Can't Do That" (Lennon, McCartney)
"Do You Love Me" (Berry Gordy, Jr.)
"Can't Buy Me Love" (Lennon, McCartney)
"I Want to Hold Your Hand" (Lennon, McCartney)
"Bits and Pieces" (Dave Clark, Mike Smith)

Unreleased recordings from the A Bit of Liverpool sessions:
"I Saw Him Standing There" – featuring Florence Ballard on lead vocals
"Not Fade Away" – featuring Diana Ross, Florence Ballard and Mary Wilson on lead vocals

Personnel
 Diana Ross, Florence Ballard and Mary Wilson – lead and backing vocals
 Berry Gordy, Hal Davis and Marc Gordon – producers

Critical response
In 1982 The Illustrated Encyclopedia of Black Music described A Bit of Liverpool as one of "several banal albums" recorded in the midst of their run of hits.
The 2011 edition of The Encyclopedia of Popular Music rated the album 2 out of 5 stars.

Chart history

Weekly charts

Year-end charts

References

1964 albums
The Supremes albums
Covers albums
Tribute albums
Albums produced by Berry Gordy
Albums produced by Hal Davis
Albums recorded at Hitsville U.S.A.
Motown albums